The Wheat Committee, an American study group on the establishment of accounting principles, was brought into being in 1971 in order to examine the operation of the Accounting Principles Board and to avoid governmental rule-making. It was headed by Francis Wheat. The Study Group submitted its recommendations to the AICPA Council in the spring of 1972, which led to the replacement of the Accounting Principles Board with the FASB, the Financial Accounting Standards Board in 1973.

References

Accounting in the United States
1971 establishments in the United States